Likhopo Football Club is a Lesotho football club located in Maseru, Lesotho. It currently plays in Lesotho Premier League.

Titles
Lesotho Premier League: 2
2005, 2006

Performance in CAF competitions
CAF Champions League: 2 appearances
2006 – Preliminary Round
2007 – Preliminary Round

Lesotho Premier League clubs
Organisations based in Maseru

External links